The Greater Manchester Integrated Transport Authority (GMITA) was a local government institution responsible for the strategic direction of passenger transport in Greater Manchester. It existed from 1969 to 1974 as the SELNEC Passenger Transport Authority and was then replaced by Greater Manchester County Council. It was created again in 1986 as the Greater Manchester Passenger Transport Authority. It was renamed in 2008 as the Greater Manchester Integrated Transport Authority. Policy of the authority was delivered by the Greater Manchester Passenger Transport Executive. It was replaced by the Greater Manchester Combined Authority in 2011.

Reconstitution in 1986
The passenger transport authority was reconstituted by the Local Government Act 1985 in 1986 to replace the Greater Manchester County Council which was abolished. Its membership was made up of appointed councillors from the councils in Greater Manchester, based on population: Bolton 3, Bury 2, Manchester 5, Oldham 3, Rochdale 2, Salford 3, Stockport 3, Tameside 3, Trafford 3, and Wigan 3.

Reform and replacement
The Local Transport Act 2008 reconstituted it as the Greater Manchester Integrated Transport Authority.

The integrated transport authority was replaced by Transport for Greater Manchester in 2011, which is accountable to the Greater Manchester Combined Authority.

References

Local government in Greater Manchester
Transport in Greater Manchester
2011 disestablishments in England
1986 establishments in England
1969 establishments in England
1974 disestablishments in England